The Kodiak Archipelago is an archipelago (group of islands) south of the main land-mass of the state of Alaska (United States), about  by air south-west of Anchorage in the Gulf of Alaska. The largest island in the archipelago is Kodiak Island, the second-largest island in the United States. The archipelago contains  of land. The Kodiak Archipelago contains about 40 small glaciers, numerous streams and many species of land and marine animals. Much of its land is forested.

The Kodiak Island Borough includes all of the Kodiak Archipelago and some lands on the mainland.  The Kodiak National Wildlife Refuge encompasses a large percentage of the land in the archipelago.

Islands in the Kodiak Archipelago 
 Afognak – second largest island
 Aiaktalik Island
 Ban Island
 Barren Islands – most northerly
 Ushagat Island
 Nord Island
 East Amatuli Island
 West Amatuli Island
 Chirikof Island – most southernly
 Dark Island
 Geese Islands
 Kodiak Island – largest island in the archipelago
 Long Island
 Marmot Island – most easterly
 Near Island
 Raspberry Island
 Semidi Islands – most westerly
 Aghiyuk Island
 Anowiki Island
 Chowiet Island
 Kateekuk Island
 Kiliktagik Island
 Shuyak Island
 Sitkalidak Island
 Spruce Island
 Nelson Island
 Sundstrom Island
 Trinity Islands
 Tugidak Island
 Sitkinak Island
 Two-Headed Island
 Uganik Island
 Ugak Island
 Whale Island
 Woody Island

Holocene archaeology  
"The archaeological record contains several seemingly abrupt changes suggesting population replacements to some, but the current view, followed here, is that there has been long-term cultural continuity." (Ames et al., p. 61)

The Late Holocene contains four cultural periods: the Early Kachemak, the Late Kachemak, the Koniag, and the Alutiiq. Each period will be broken down by time period, also including the significance of each.

 Early Kachemak (1850–500 BC) = The period is marked by the shift in mobility patterns: residential foragers to logistical collectors. Dwellings were small in size. Technology and subsistence activities were made more efficient. More efficient ways of processing food were introduced. Material remains include toggling harpoons, netweights, ground slate points, nets, ulus (chopping knife). The Ocean Bay people were the first to inhabit the area. They were considered to be a maritime people, but exploited both marine and terrestrial resources, including mammals and fish. Their only hunting kit included hooks, lines, harpoons, and lances with chipped stone points. By the Middle Holocene, more specialized tool kits were introduced. Originally living in small, dispersed settlements, the small 2-3m  tents were replaced by small pit houses around 2000 BC.
 Late Kachemak (500 BC – AD 1200) = The period is marked by large populations. Logistical patterns of mobility kept increasing, and community sizes increased, having up to ten dwellings. Storage facilities are also introduced. Mortuary practices are considered to be elaborate, and the finding of labrets suggest that social differentiation increased. Craft specialization increased as well. 
 Koniag (AD 1200 – European contact) = The population reached its peak. Houses and settlement sizes continued to increase, suggesting the development of social ranking. Architecture started to become more elaborate and storage features kept increasing in size. Shift in location toward the coast suggests better access to marine resources, specifically to whales. "There is also evidence of intensified salmon fishing, food production and processing specializations, exchange, and investment in carpentry". (Ames et al., p. 62)
 Alutiiq (Modern) = These islands are the original or traditional homes of the Alutiiqu (previously Koniag) peoples. The coastal environment provided excellent productivity for these people, as the terrestrial environment seemed somewhat low or lacked natural resources.

References 

 
Archaeological sites in Alaska
Landforms of Kodiak Island Borough, Alaska
Archipelagoes of Alaska
Archipelagoes of the Pacific Ocean